Total Eclipse is an album by jazz vibraphonist Bobby Hutcherson, released on the Blue Note label in 1969. It features Hutcherson's first recordings with saxophonist Harold Land, who would become a regular collaborator with Hutcherson throughout the early 1970s. Four of the five tracks are Hutcherson compositions, the exception being Chick Corea's "Matrix".

Composition and critical reception
In a 2013 profile of Hutcherson for Down Beat, Dan Ouellette wrote that Total Eclipse was a "marquee outing for the group, where hard-bop entered into the exploratory zone.  The album dips in and out of Hutcherson's daredevil sensibility, with inventive vibe romps and pure elation."  Ouellette described Hutcherson's composition "Pompeian" as "a questing voyage with a whimsical open and close and a complex middle section that is avant-leaning and charged as Hutcherson paints dark colors on the marimbas."

AllMusic reviewer Steve Huey agreed that "Pompeian" was an "ambitious piece," but thought that "overall...the album foreshadows Hutcherson's move away from his explicit avant-garde leanings and into a still-advanced but more structured modernist framework. For some reason, Total Eclipse was the only post-bop-styled album Hutcherson and Land recorded together that was released at the time; though they're all high-quality, this remains perhaps the best of the lot."  Huey went on to praise Land's playing, writing that his "solo lines are fluid and lengthy, assimilating some of Coltrane's innovations while remaining accessibly soulful" and that his "rounded, echoing tone is a nice contrast for the coolly cerebral post-bop that fills Total Eclipse."

Track listing
All compositions by Hutcherson except as indicated.

 "Herzog" – 6:36
 "Total Eclipse" – 8:54
 "Matrix" (Corea) – 6:44
 "Same Shame" – 9:28
 "Pompeian" – 8:50

Personnel
Bobby Hutcherson – vibraphone, marimba, orchestra bells
Harold Land – tenor saxophone, flute
Chick Corea – piano
Reggie Johnson – bass
Joe Chambers – drums

References 

1969 albums
Blue Note Records albums
Bobby Hutcherson albums
Albums produced by Francis Wolff
Albums produced by Duke Pearson